Charles Ahiadzro Adzofia was a Ghanaian politician. He was the member of parliament for the Anlo East constituency from 1959 to 1965. He was the replacement for Charles Henry Chapman when the latter resigned as a member of parliament due to his appointment as a member of the Public Service Commission in 1959. He stood for the seat on the ticket of the Convention People's Party unopposed. In 1965 when the number of constuencies had been increased he became the member of parliament for the Dzodze constituency. He remained in parliament until 1966 when the Nkrumah government was overthrown.

See also
 List of MPs elected in the 1965 Ghanaian parliamentary election

References

Date of birth missing
Date of death missing
Ghanaian MPs 1956–1965
Ghanaian MPs 1965–1966
Convention People's Party (Ghana) politicians